"That Sunday, That Summer" is a swing ballad, written by Joe Sherman and George David Weiss and published in 1963.

Nat King Cole recording
The highest charting version is by Nat King Cole. It was recorded on May 16, 1963 at Capitol Records in Los Angeles with a Ralph Carmichael arrangement and was released August 31st, 1963.  It reached #12 on the Billboard charts Hot 100 and #3 on the Middle-Road Singles (Adult Contemporary) chart, in 1963.

Other recorded versions
Other versions have also been recorded:
The Beegie Adair Trio 1998
Ernestine Anderson 1990
Roger Cairns 2006
Betty Carter 1988
Natalie Cole 1991
Kathie Lee Gifford 1992
Bill Henderson
Julie London 1964
Johnny Mathis 1983 (Johnny Mathis & Natalie Cole - Unforgettable - A Tribute To Nat King Cole) 
Bob McHugh 2001
Dan McIntyre 2000
Claressa Monteiro
Jimmy Rowles
Bobby Scott
The George Shearing Quintet 2001
Robert Stewart
Sweet N’ Jazzy 1999
Dinah Washington 1963
Jack Wilson
George Benson 2013

References

1963 songs
Songs written by George David Weiss
Nat King Cole songs
Songs written by Joe Sherman (songwriter)
Pop standards
Songs about nostalgia